Bellerophon is a genus of extinct paleozoic marine molluscs of uncertain position (Gastropoda or Monoplacophora) in the family Bellerophontidae.

The genus was named after Bellerophon, the ancient Greek hero.

Bellerophon is the type genus of the family Bellerophontidae.

Shell description
The genus is characterised by a shell which is globose, convolute, and planispiral (symmetrically coiled). The shell of Bellerophon superficially resembles that of a miniature cephalopod (e.g. Nautilus or an ammonite), except that septa are lacking.

The shell of Bellerophon is often a couple of centimeters in maximum dimension. The external surface is smooth, ornamented only by growth lines.  There is a low crest or ridge running along the midline of the shell.

Many specimens of Bellerophon show something resembling a "waterline" about halfway up the shell, suggesting that a large amount of the mantle and foot were exposed and covered the outside of the shell, as in the extant Cypraeidae and Naticidae.

Possible life habits
These animals were probably quick moving (for gastropods), relying on speed to avoid predators and, when this was not possible, withdrawing deeply into the shell.

Range of distribution
The genus occurs worldwide, and is known from the Silurian to the Early Triassic periods.

Discussion of the taxonomy
Although usually classified as a primitive gastropod, there is a minority view that the Bellerophontida actually represented a more primitive, untorted type of mollusk, (see Torsion) which evolved a spiral shell independently.  Another view is that some Bellerophontids, including Bellerophon, were torted gastropods, but that others were untorted forms.

Species
Species within the genus Bellerophon include:

subgenus Bellerophon
 Bellerophon needlensis - from Late Mississippian from Utah
 Bellerophon welshi - from Late Mississippian from Utah

subgenus ?
 Bellerophon bicarenus Lévillé from early Carboniferous
 Bellerophon graphicus Moore from the late Pennsylvanian (Virgilian) of Kansas
 Bellerophon regularis (Waagen) from the Permian of India
 Bellerophon vasulites Montfort - the type species, from the Middle Devonian of Germany
 and others

References

 P. D. de Montfort. 1808. Conchyliologie systématique, et classification méthodique des coquilles; offfrant leurs figures, leur arrangement générique, leurs descriptions caractéristiques, leurs noms; ainsi que leur synonymie en plusieurs langues. Coquilles univalves, cloisonnées 1

Further reading 
 Moore, R.C., Lalicker, C.G., and Fischer, A. G., 1952, Invertebrate Fossils, McGraw Hill Book Company, New York; 766 pp.

External links
 Bellerophontida - Palaeos

Prehistoric molluscs of Europe
Bellerophontidae
Silurian molluscs
Devonian molluscs
Carboniferous molluscs
Permian molluscs
Triassic molluscs
Early Triassic extinctions
Silurian first appearances
Late Devonian animals
Prehistoric molluscs of North America
Jeffersonville Limestone
Paleozoic life of Ontario
Paleozoic life of Alberta
Paleozoic life of Manitoba
Paleozoic life of the Northwest Territories
Paleozoic life of Quebec